Abathenna Devayalage Champika Premadasa (born November 4, 1948) is a Sri Lankan politician and a member of the Parliament of Sri Lanka.

References
 

1948 births
Living people
Members of the 11th Parliament of Sri Lanka
Members of the 12th Parliament of Sri Lanka
Members of the 13th Parliament of Sri Lanka
Members of the 14th Parliament of Sri Lanka
Members of the 15th Parliament of Sri Lanka
United National Party politicians
Deputy ministers of Sri Lanka